The 2019–20 Women's FA Cup was the 50th staging of the Women's FA Cup, a knockout cup competition for women's football teams in England. Manchester City were the defending champions, having beaten West Ham United 3–0 in the previous final. The draw was split regionally, dividing teams into north and south sections until the Fourth Round proper.

Teams 
A total of 300 teams had their entries to the tournament accepted by The Football Association. 216 teams enter at the extra preliminary round or preliminary round. Teams that play in the FA Women's National League Division One are given exemption to the Second Round Qualifying, while teams in the Northern and Southern Premier Divisions enter at the Second Round Proper. Teams in the FA Women's Super League and FA Women's Championship are exempted to the Fourth Round Proper.

Extra preliminary round
As a result of 300 teams entering the competition, twenty teams were drawn into an extra preliminary round, which was played by Sunday 18 August 2019.

Preliminary round
Ninety eight matches were scheduled for the preliminary round, which were played by Sunday 1 September 2019. The 196 teams taking part consisted of 186 teams with a bye to this stage, plus the ten match winners from the previous round. Sedgley & Gornal United and Boston United both withdrew after having their entry accepted which resulted in walkover wins for Droitwich Spa and Loughborough Students respectively. The match between Whyteleafe and Millwall Lionesses was played, ending in a 6–3 victory for Millwall, but Whyteleafe were later awarded the win because Millwall had fielded two unregistered players.

First round qualifying
Forty-nine matches were scheduled for the first round qualifying, the majority of which were played on Sunday 22 September 2019. Morecambe's tie against FC United of Manchester was postponed on this date, as was the re-arranged fixture a week later, leading to the tie being reversed and Morecambe losing their home advantage. Worthing's tie against Whyteleafe was played on 29 September, having been delayed a week due to Millwall Lionesses (who had been due to play in this match) being expelled from the competition. The round was made up solely of the winners from the previous round and did not include the introduction of any new teams.

Second round qualifying
Forty-eight matches in the second round qualifying were played on Sunday 6 October 2019. The round was made up of the 49 winners from the previous round and the introduction of all 47 FA Women's National League Division One teams.

Third round qualifying
Twenty-four matches were scheduled for the second round qualifying, played on Sunday 27 October 2019. The round was made up of the 48 winners from the previous round and did not include the introduction of any new teams. A total of five games were delayed by weather and were rescheduled for Sunday 3 November.

First round proper
Twelve matches were scheduled for the first round proper, played on Sunday 10 November 2019. The round was made up of the 24 winners from the previous round and did not include the introduction of any new teams.

Second round proper
Eighteen matches were scheduled for the second round proper, to be played on Sunday 1 December 2019. The round was made up of the 12 winners from the previous round as well as the introduction of all 24 third tier clubs from the FA Women's National League Northern and Southern Premier Divisions.

Third round proper
Nine matches were scheduled for the third round proper, which were played on Sundays 5 and 12 January 2020. The round was made up of the 18 winners from the previous round and did not include the introduction of any new teams.

Fourth round proper
16 matches were scheduled for the fourth round proper. The Manchester derby was selected as the televised game for the round and moved to Saturday 25 January 2020 with the rest played on Sunday 26 January 2020. Southampton Women's F.C. vs Crystal Palace was abandoned in the 78th minute due to adverse weather conditions and was replayed on Sunday 2 February 2020. The 32 teams taking part consisted of 23 FA Women's Super League and FA Women's Championship teams exempted to this stage, plus the nine match winners from the previous round.

Fifth round proper
Eight matches were scheduled for the fifth round proper which were due to be played on 16 and 17 February 2020 but three matches were postponed. The 16 teams taking part are the match winners from the previous round. The lowest ranked team left in the competition, Ipswich Town of the FA Women's National League Division One South East (tier 4), were drawn against defending champions Manchester City.

Quarter-finals
The four quarter-final fixtures were scheduled to be played on Sunday 15 March 2020 but postponed due to coronavirus pandemic. They were eventually rescheduled for 26–27 September 2020.

Semi-finals

Final

The final was played at Wembley Stadium on Saturday 1 November 2020.

Television rights
The following matches were/will be broadcast live on UK television:

Notes and references

References

Women's FA Cup seasons
Women's FA Cup
Women's FA Cup, 2019-20